Innovation economics is new, and growing field of economic theory and applied/experimental economics that emphasizes innovation and entrepreneurship. It comprises both the application of any type of innovations, especially technological, but not only, into economic use. In classical economics this is the application of customer new technology into economic use; but also it could refer to the field of innovation and experimental economics that refers the new economic science developments that may be considered innovative. In his 1942 book Capitalism, Socialism and Democracy, economist Joseph Schumpeter introduced the notion of an innovation economy. He argued that evolving institutions, entrepreneurs and technological changes were at the heart of economic growth. However, it is only in recent years that "innovation economy," grounded in Schumpeter's ideas, has become a mainstream concept".

Historical origins 
Joseph Schumpeter was one of the first and most important scholars who extensively tackled the question of innovation in economics. In contrast to his contemporary John Maynard Keynes, Schumpeter contended that evolving institutions, entrepreneurs and technological change were at the heart of economic growth, not independent forces that are largely unaffected by policy. He argued that "capitalism can only be understood as an evolutionary process of continuous innovation and 'creative destruction'".

It is only in the 21st century that a theory and narrative of economic growth focused on innovation that was grounded in Schumpeter's ideas has emerged. Innovation economics attempted to answer the fundamental problem in the puzzle of total factor productivity growth. Continual growth of output could no longer be explained only in increase of inputs used in the production process as understood in industrialization. Hence, innovation economics focused on a theory of economic creativity that would impact the theory of the firm and organization decision-making. Hovering between heterodox economics that emphasized the fragility of conventional assumptions and orthodox economics that ignored the fragility of such assumptions, innovation economics aims for joint didactics between the two. As such, it enlarges the Schumpeterian analyses of new technological system by incorporating new ideas of information and communication technology in the global economy.

Innovation economics emerges from other schools of thought in economics, including new institutional economics, new growth theory, endogenous growth theory, evolutionary economics and neo-Schumpeterian economics. It provides an economic framework that explains and helps support growth in today's knowledge economy.

Leading theorists of innovation economics include both formal economists as well as management theorists, technology policy experts and others. These include Paul Romer, Elhanan Helpman, Bronwyn Hall, W. Brian Arthur, Robert Axtell, Richard R. Nelson, Richard Lipsey, Michael Porter, Keun Lee and Christopher Freeman.

Theory 
Innovation economists believe that what primarily drives economic growth in today's knowledge-based economy is not capital accumulation as neoclassical economics asserts, but innovative capacity spurred by appropriable knowledge and technological externalities. Economic growth in innovation economics is the end-product of:
 knowledge (tacit vs. codified);
 regimes and policies allowing for entrepreneurship and innovation (i.e. R&D expenditures, permits and licenses);
 technological spillovers and externalities between collaborative firms;
 systems of innovation that create innovative environments (i.e. clusters, agglomerations and metropolitan areas).

In 1970, economist Milton Friedman said in the New York Times that a business's sole purpose is to generate profits for their shareholders, and companies that pursued other missions would be less competitive, resulting in fewer benefits to owners, employees and society. Yet, data over the past several decades shows that while profits matter, good firms supply far more, particularly in bringing innovation to the market. This fosters economic growth, employment gains and other society-wide benefits. Business school professor David Ahlstrom asserts that "the main goal of business is to develop new and innovative goods and services that generate economic growth while delivering benefits to society".

In contrast to neoclassical economics, innovation economics offer differing perspectives on main focus, reasons for economic growth and the assumptions of context between economic actors:

Despite the differences in economic thought, both perspectives are based on the same core premise, namely the foundation of all economic growth is the optimization of the utilization of factors and the measure of success is how well the factor utilization is optimized. Whatever the factors, it nonetheless leads to the same situation of special endowments, varying relative prices and production processes. Thus, while the two differ in theoretical concepts, innovation economics can find fertile ground in mainstream economics, rather than remain in diametric contention.

Evidence 
Empirical evidence worldwide points to a positive link between technological innovation and economic performance. The drive of biotech firms in Germany was due to the R&D subsidies to joint projects, network partners and close cognitive distance of collaborative partners within a cluster. For instance:
 These factors increased patent performance in the biotech industry.
 Innovation capacity explains much of the GDP growth in India and China between 1981 and 2004, but especially in the 1990s. Their development of a National Innovation System through heavy investment of R&D expenditures and personnel, patents and high-tech/service exports strengthened their innovation capacity. By linking the science sector with the business sector, establishing incentives for innovative activities and balancing the import of technology and indigenous R&D effort, both countries experienced rapid economic growth in recent decades.
 The Council of Foreign Relations also asserted that since the end of the 1970s the U.S. has gained a disproportionate share of the world's wealth through their aggressive pursuit of technological change, demonstrating that technological innovation is a central catalyst of steady economic performance.

Concisely, evidence shows that innovation contributes to steady economic growth and rise in per capita income.

However, some empirical studies investigating the innovation-performance-link lead to rather mixed results and indicate that the relationship is more subtle and complex than commonly assumed. In particular, the relationship between innovativeness and performance seems to differ in intensity and significance across empirical contexts, environmental circumstances and conceptual dimensions.

All of the above has taken place in an era of data constraint as identified by Zvi Griliches in the 1990s. Because the primary domain of innovation is commerce, the key data resides there, continually out of campus reach in reports hidden within factories, corporate offices and technical centers. This recusal still stymies progress today. Recent attempts at data transference have led not least to the positive link (above) being upgraded to exact algebra between R&D productivity and GDP, allowing prediction from one to the other. This is pending further disclosure from commercial sources, but several pertinent documents are already available.

Geography 
While innovation is important, it is not a happenstance occurrence as a natural harbor or natural resources are, but a deliberate, concerted effort of markets, institutions, policymakers and effective use of geographic space. In global economic restructuring, location has become a key element in establishing competitive advantage as regions focus on their unique assets to spur innovation (i.e. information technology in Silicon Valley, or digital media in Seoul). Even more, thriving metropolitan economies that carry multiple clusters (i.e. Tokyo, Chicago and London) essentially fuel national economies through their pools of human capital, innovation, quality places and infrastructure. Cities become "innovative spaces" and "cradles of creativity" as drivers of innovation. They become essential to the system of innovation through the supply side as ready, available, abundant capital and labor, good infrastructure for productive activities and diversified production structures that spawn synergies and hence innovation. In addition, they grow due to the demand side as diverse population of varying occupations, ideas and skills, high and differentiated level of consumer demand and constant recreation of urban order especially infrastructure of streets, water systems, energy and transportation.

Worldwide examples 
 Semiconductors and information technology in Silicon Valley in California
 High-technology and life sciences in Research Triangle Park in North Carolina
 Energy companies in Energy Corridor in Houston, Texas
 Financial products and services in New York City
 Biotechnology in Genome Valley in Hyderabad, India and Boston, Massachusetts
 Nanotechnology in Tech Valley, New York (College of Nanoscale Science and Engineering)
 Precision engineering in South Yorkshire, United Kingdom
 Petrochemical complexes in Rio de Janeiro, Brazil
 Train locomotive and rolling stock manufacturing in Beijing, China
 Automotive engineering in Baden-Württemberg, Germany
 Digital media technologies in Digital Media City in Seoul, South Korea

See also 
 Business cluster
 Economic development
 Keynesian economics
 Knowledge economy
 Innovation
 International Innovation Index
 Metropolitan economy
 Neoclassical economics

References

Further reading

External links 
 Innovation Economics: The Economic Doctrine for the 21st Century
 Books and Journal Articles on Innovation Economics
 Innovation Economics: The Integration and Capitalization of Knowledge
 Innovation Economics Roundtable
 Business Week Podcast – Innovation Economics
 Business Models Innovation
 Innovation Economics in practice for city/regional growth and economic development

 
Economic growth
Macroeconomic theories
Innovation